The AN/APG-68 radar is a long range (up to 296 km) Pulse-doppler radar designed by Westinghouse (now Northrop Grumman) to replace AN/APG-66 radar in the F-16 Fighting Falcon.  The AN/APG-68(V)8 and earlier radar system consists of the following line-replaceable units:
 Antenna
 Dual Mode Transmitter (DMT)
 Modular Low-power radio frequency (MLPRF)
 Programmable signal processor (PSP)

The AN/APG-68(V)9 radar system consists of the following line-replaceable units:
 Antenna
 Medium Duty Transmitter (MDT)
 Modular Receiver/Exciter (MoRE)
 Common Radar Processor (CoRP)

The AN/APG-68(V)9 radar is the latest development. Besides the increase in scan range compared to the previous version, it has a Synthetic aperture radar (SAR) capability.

The APG-68(V)9 has equipped several variants, including the Egyptian Air Force, Israeli Air Force, Chilean Air Force, Republic of Singapore Air Force, Turkish Air Force, Royal Moroccan Air Force, Greek Air Force, Pakistan Air Force, Polish Air Force, Royal Thai Air Force, and Indonesian Air Force.

Specifications
Frequency: Starting Envelope frequency around 9.86 GHz.
Under AIS Testing as high as 26 GHz
Range: 296.32 km, 184 miles
Range for 5m2 aerial target is 105 km
Search cone: 120 degrees × 120 degrees
Azimuth angular coverage: ±10 degrees / ± 30 degrees / ± 60 degrees
Programmable Signal Processor (PSP) - The core radar component which is responsible for signal processing, frequency selection, signal digitization for B-Scope display.  The PSP is controlled through the F-16 Heads Down Display Set (HDDS) or what is commonly called the Multi-Function Displays (MFDs).  The PSP is directed by the system operational flight program (OFP), which is controlled and modified for new threats or addition radar system requirements.  The PSP also contains all the controls circuitry for radar A/A and A/G operational scan patterns and SAR/ISAR operation.
Modular Low Powered Radio Frequency (MLPRF) - The frequency generator for the radar system.  Frequency generation is dependent on the random frequency selection from the radar tables within the PSP upon system start-up.  The MLPRF will generate a small amount of RF Drive, which is sent to the Dual Mode Transmitter (DMT), where it is amplified and a small RF sample is sent to the MLPRF for comparison checksum (more like a check and balance system).  The MLPRF also is responsible for the receiving of the radar return, generating the RF injection noise (for RF discrimination), and the processed RF within the MLPRF is then later sent to the PSP for video processing and threat/target matching against the radar threat tables within the PSP, prior to flightcrew system display.
Dual Mode Transmitter (DMT) - A 24,000 volt radar transmitter, containing a TWT, which generates the amplified RF to be sent to the radar Antenna for system emission.  The TWT operates by optical pulses received from the DMT's internal Pulse Decker Unit and TWT Cathode/Anode voltage inputs.
Antenna - A planar array antenna, which is constructed to receive RF data through a waveguide system.  The transmitted and received pulses are controlled in time by the PMW (Pulse Modulated Wave) radar design, and the waveguide duplexer assembly.  Internal to the antenna are Uniphaser Assemblies (used for quadrature phase control), Phase Shifters (used of quadrature I/Q data) and gimbalized motor control for antenna positioning and position correction.

References

External links
 Northrop Grumman APG-68(V)9 Site
 AN/APG-68 Global Security.com

Aircraft radars
Military radars of the United States
Military electronics of the United States
Radars of the United States Air Force
Synthetic aperture radar
Military radars of Poland